Captain John Hollington Grayburn VC (30 January 1918 – 20 September 1944) was an English recipient of the Victoria Cross, the highest and most prestigious award for gallantry in the face of the enemy that can be awarded to British and Commonwealth forces.

Born in 1918, Grayburn was educated at Sherborne School in Dorset and joined the Army Cadet Force before the outbreak of the Second World War. He was initially commissioned into the Oxfordshire and Buckinghamshire Light Infantry and later joined the Parachute Regiment. At the age of 26 he went into action in the Battle of Arnhem where he was part of the small force that was able to reach Arnhem road bridge. Between 17 and 20 September he led his platoon, and later the remnants of a battalion, in the defence of the small British perimeter around the bridge, but was killed after standing up in full view of a German tank in order to direct his men to new positions.

Grayburn is buried in the Arnhem Oosterbeek War Cemetery, and his Victoria Cross is displayed at the Parachute Regiment and Airborne Forces Museum in England.

Early life
John Grayburn was born on 30 January 1918 on Manora Island, India, the son of Lionel Markham and Gertrude Grayburn. The family returned to England whilst he was young.  From 1931 to 1935 he attended Sherborne School in Dorset where he was a member of Abbey House. After leaving Sherborne School he joined the Hong Kong and Shanghai Banking Corporation.

Grayburn played rugby for the Chiltern Rugby Club between 1927 and 1939 and was a skilled boxer.

Grayburn joined the Army Cadet Force and was posted to the 1st (London) Cadet Force, The Queen's Royal Regiment. In September 1940 he was given an emergency commission to second lieutenant and was posted to the Oxfordshire and Buckinghamshire Light Infantry.

Second World War
Grayburn was promoted to war substantive lieutenant in 1942 and married Marcelle Chambers, with whom he had a son, in the same year. However, the Ox and Bucks remained on the home front and Grayburn became bored with the inactivity. Instead he applied to the Parachute Regiment and in June 1943 he was transferred to the 7th (Light Infantry) Parachute Battalion. The following year he was transferred to the regiment's 2nd Battalion, under the command of Lieutenant Colonel John Frost, and took command of 2 Platoon, A Company.

Battle of Arnhem
The Battle of Arnhem was part of Operation Market Garden, an attempt to secure a string of bridges through the Netherlands. At Arnhem the British 1st Airborne Division and Polish 1st Independent Parachute Brigade were tasked with securing bridges across the Lower Rhine, the final objectives of the operation. However, the airborne forces that dropped on 17 September were not aware that the 9th SS and 10th SS Panzer divisions were also near Arnhem for rest and refit. Their presence added a substantial number of Panzergrenadiers, tanks and self-propelled guns to the German defences and the Allies suffered heavily in the ensuing battle. Only a small force managed to hold one end of the Arnhem road bridge before being overrun on 21 September. The rest of the division became trapped in a small pocket west of the bridge and had to be evacuated on 25 September. The Allies failed to cross the Rhine, which remained under German control until Allied offensives in March 1945.

Advance to the bridge
1st Airborne Division's commanding officer, Major General Roy Urquhart, originally planned for the 2nd Battalion to lead the 1st Parachute Brigade into Arnhem to secure the road, rail and pontoon bridges over the Lower Rhine. Frost chose Major Digby Tatham-Warter's A Company to lead the battalion's march from the drop zones to the bridges, knowing him to be "a thruster if ever there was". A Company was in action almost at once, ambushing a small German recce group near the drop zone. The company moved off through the woods toward the river road, with each platoon taking turns to lead. There was a brief plan to advance the platoons by jeep once out of the woods, but German forces were encountered shortly afterwards and the idea was not followed up. Grayburn had just arrived at a road junction and headed north when the men behind him came under enemy fire. After laying a smokescreen he led a charge that cleared the enemy positions. Tatham-Warter lacked confidence in the Airborne radio equipment and had trained his platoons to use bugle calls; it was with the charge that Grayburn signalled that the advance could be resumed.

A Company was not significantly delayed by the German patrols it encountered later, although the presence of cheering Dutch crowds delayed the whole battalion as it passed through Oosterbeek. As they approached the railway bridge, C Company detached to capture it, but German engineers blew the bridge just as the British were starting to cross it. A Company now encountered enemy armoured cars, but successfully skirted them by manoeuvering through the back gardens of the houses on either side of the road At 8pm, as darkness fell, Grayburn's platoon led A Company into Arnhem centre and under the main ramp of Arnhem road bridge. Tatham-Warter deployed his platoons around the ramp; 2 Platoon covered both sides of the northernmost extreme of the ramp where it fed into the town centre.

Defence of the bridge

Grayburn did not fire on the occasional German traffic still using the bridge, preferring not to advertise the Allied presence until the rest of the battalion had arrived. Upon his arrival, Frost began securing more buildings around the ramp, and a small section attack was made on the bridge. The German defenders quickly repulsed this however and Tatham-Warter organised a stronger attack, to be led by Grayburn.

As soon as it was sufficiently dark, Grayburn led his platoon along the ramp to the bridge, their faces blackened and their boots muffled with strips of torn up curtains. The platoon moved forward on either side of the girders along the sides of the road, but was quickly spotted by enemy forces on the bridge. Grayburn was shot in the shoulder but continued to press his men on, until the withering enemy fire became too intense and he was forced to pull them back. He was the last person to descend from the ramp into cover.

Over the next few days, every man of the 700 or so who had made it to the bridge and whether a combat trooper or not, was engaged in the defence of the British perimeter. A Company was sited in the buildings on either side of the ramp nearest the river, and on Monday 18 2 Platoon occupied a house on the east side. This sector came under increasing attack from tanks and infantry of the 10th SS Panzer Division, and the building was later burnt down.

The rest of the division made several efforts to reinforce Frost's men, but were unable to break through the German forces that surrounded the bridge. The exact disposition of the British troops subsequently became more confused as the battle developed into house to house fighting. Tatham-Warter took command of 2nd Battalion on Tuesday 19, and Grayburn temporarily took command of A Company after Tatham-Warter's designated replacement was wounded. Grayburn led several fighting patrols that forced the Germans to commit more armour but as Wednesday 20 dawned, the British position was becoming untenable. As the Germans squeezed the perimeter they laid explosives on a section of the ramp crossing a road next to the riverbank, lest XXX Corps should break through and capture the bridge from the south. Grayburn led another patrol that forced the enemy away from the arch while Royal Engineers removed the fuzes. Grayburn was wounded again but quickly returned after being treated, now with his head bandaged and arm in a sling. German infantry later returned to relay the charges and a second patrol went out to remove them. A German tank had come forward to cover the arch, but in order to direct his men to better positions Grayburn stood up in full view of it. The tank's machine gun killed him instantly.

Frost's perimeter gradually shrank as men and ammunition ran low, and Frost himself was wounded on 20 September. A brief ceasefire was held later that day to allow the evacuation of wounded men in danger of becoming trapped and being burned alive in the cellars of wrecked buildings. Despite the best efforts of the remaining men to hold out overnight, they were finally overrun in the early hours of 21 September.

Victoria Cross

Major Tatham-Warter was able to escape German captivity and later led nearly 140 men to safety in Operation Pegasus. Upon his return to England he wrote a report on the action at the bridge, which led to Grayburn's posthumous promotion to captain and the award of the Victoria Cross.

The full citation for Grayburn's Victoria Cross appeared in a supplement to the London Gazette on 23 January 1945, reading:

Legacy
After his death, Grayburn was buried on the bridge embankment close to where he was killed. His remains were recovered in 1948 and added to the Arnhem Oosterbeek War Cemetery. Although most graves in the cemetery are organised by unit, Grayburn's is separate from the other parachute formations. His VC is in the care of the Parachute Regiment and Airborne Forces Museum and there are plaques in his memory at Chalfont St Giles parish church, and at the Hong Kong and Shanghai Banking Corporation war memorial in Hong Kong, where Grayburn's uncle worked before the war. He is also commemorated on the Sherborne School War Memorial and in the Sherborne School Book of Remembrance. A room in the clubhouse of Amersham and Chiltern Rugby Club is named after him. He is also named prominently on the front panel of the plinth unveiled at the new student accommodation in James Wolfe Road, Oxford on 16 August 2019 at the site of Cowley Barracks.

In the 1977 film A Bridge Too Far, Christopher Good played a composite character of Grayburn and Tatham-Warter.

See also
Four other men were awarded the Victoria Cross at Arnhem:
Major Robert Henry Cain, 2nd Battalion South Staffordshire Regiment.
Lance-Sergeant John Daniel Baskeyfield, 2nd Battalion South Staffordshire Regiment.
Flight Lieutenant David Samuel Anthony Lord 271 Squadron, Royal Air Force.
Captain Lionel Ernest Queripel, 10th Battalion Parachute Regiment.
List of Second World War Victoria Cross recipients

Notes

References

Bibliography

External links
The Arnhem Roll of Honour Database: John H. Grayburn

J.H. Grayburn, Book of Remembrance, Sherborne School
Sherborne School Archives

1918 births
1944 deaths
British World War II recipients of the Victoria Cross
British Parachute Regiment officers
British Army personnel killed in World War II
People educated at Sherborne School
Oxfordshire and Buckinghamshire Light Infantry officers
British Army recipients of the Victoria Cross
Burials at Arnhem Oosterbeek War Cemetery
Military personnel of British India